Andreea Grecu (born 10 January 1994) is a Romanian sprinter and bobsledder.

Grecu competed at the 2014 Winter Olympics for Romania. She teamed with Maria Constantin in the two-woman event, finishing 17th.

As of February 2015, her best showing as a brakewoman at the World Championships is 9th, in the 2014 FIBT World Championships.
As of September 2015, she competed in athletics, World Championships Beijing at 4x400m relay.

Her best finish in an Olympic discipline as a brakewoman is 15th in 2018.
Grecu made her World Cup debut as a pilot in 2016. As a pilot she won gold medal in 2018 IBSF U26 World Championships, St.Moritz in two-woman event with Florentina Marincu-Iușco. In 2019 she won silver medal in IBSF U26 World Championships, Königssee in two-woman event with Teodora Vlad. As of January 2019, her best World Cup finish is 5th and 4th place at European Championships, Königssee, in a pair of events in 2018-19.

References

1994 births
Living people
Romanian female bobsledders
Romanian female sprinters
Olympic bobsledders of Romania
Sportspeople from Bucharest
Bobsledders at the 2014 Winter Olympics
Bobsledders at the 2018 Winter Olympics
Bobsledders at the 2022 Winter Olympics
World Athletics Championships athletes for Romania
Bobsledders at the 2012 Winter Youth Olympics
21st-century Romanian women